Saint-Martory is a commune in the Haute-Garonne department in southwestern France. Saint-Martory station has rail connections to Toulouse, Pau and Tarbes.

Population

See also
Communes of the Haute-Garonne department

References

Communes of Haute-Garonne